Patalione Kanimoa is a Wallisian politician from Wallis and Futuna, a French overseas collectivity in the South Pacific. He was President of the Territorial Assembly in the French government of the Wallis and Futuna. He was nominated by the French president Jacques Chirac on 18 January 2005.

On 17 April 2016, he was chosen by a rival chief council to be the new king of 'Uvea, even though the island had already a king, Tominiko Halagahu, who was installed the previous day. After almost two months of dispute, Kanimoa was officially confirmed by the administrator-superior of the French Republic as king on 3 June 2016, and has been reigning over the kingdom ever since.

References

Living people
Year of birth missing (living people)
Presidents of the Territorial Assembly of Wallis and Futuna
Members of the Territorial Assembly of Wallis and Futuna
Wallis and Futuna politicians
Politics of France
Wallis and Futuna monarchs